Tjaetsieålmaj or Thjathjeolmai (the man of the water) controlled lakes and rivers, and gave fishing fortune to people in Sami mythology. The word Thjathje means water, and is said to be the origin of the name of the Norse jötunn Tjatsi.

References

Sámi gods
Sea and river gods
Water gods